Marguerite Shuster is Harold John Ockenga Professor Emeritus of Preaching and Theology at Fuller Theological Seminary. She is an ordained minister in the Presbyterian Church (USA).

Education and Career
Born in 1947, Shuster received her B.A. from Stanford University, majoring in psychology, and her M.Div. and Ph.D. from Fuller Theological Seminary.  Before joining the faculty of Fuller Seminary she was a Presbyterian pastor for over ten years. She has published many scholarly articles and books, as well as editing and completing Paul King Jewett's Who We Are: Our Dignity as Human published in 1996.

Bibliography

Power, Pathology, Paradox:  The Dynamics of Evil and Good.  Grand Rapids:  Zondervan, 1987.

Perspectives on Christology:  Essays in Honor of Paul K. Jewett.  Grand Rapids:  Zondervan, 1991. (Editor, with Richard Muller).

Who We Are:  Our Dignity as Human.  Grand Rapids:  Eerdmans, 1996. (Editor and collaborator with Paul King Jewett).

The Fall and Sin:  What We Have Become as Sinners.  Grand Rapids:  Eerdmans, 2004.

References

Living people
Place of birth missing (living people)
1947 births
Fuller Theological Seminary faculty
Fuller Theological Seminary alumni
Presbyterian Church (USA) teaching elders
Stanford University alumni